Peterson dos Santos Peçanha (born 11 January 1980) is a Brazilian former professional footballer who played as a goalkeeper, and is a manager.

Playing career
Born in São Gonçalo, Rio de Janeiro, Peçanha began his career with Clube de Regatas do Flamengo, but did not make any official appearances for the side. In 2001, he signed for Bangu Atlético Clube, again failing to have an impact, and subsequently moved on to América Football Club also in Rio de Janeiro.

Peçanha played for three modest clubs in the next three years: Novo Horizonte Futebol Clube, Ríver Atlético Clube and São Raimundo Esporte Clube (AM). In 2005, he was bought by F.C. Paços de Ferreira of Portugal, initially as a backup to youth product Pedro. He made his Primeira Liga debut for the team against C.D. Nacional, in a 0–1 home loss on 21 August 2005.

After impressive performances for the northerners, Peçanha eventually became first choice. In the 2006–07 season, he did not miss one minute of action as the club finished in sixth position, qualifying for the UEFA Cup; he continued to start for the duration of his spell.

Peçanha changed countries again in July 2008, joining Thrasyvoulos F.C. from Greece. After only one season, which ended in relegation from the Super League, he returned to Portugal, with C.S. Marítimo. On 16 August 2009, he made his official debut, at S.L. Benfica in the season opener; he earned himself the Player of the match award in that game, notably saving a penalty from Óscar Cardozo in a 1–1 draw– the islanders finished in fifth position and qualified for European competition.

After leaving the island of Madeira in the summer of 2012, Peçanha went on to spend several years in the Romanian Liga I, in representation of FC Rapid București, FC Petrolul Ploiești and FC Viitorul Constanța. He then returned to Portugal, where he played in quick succession for C.D. Feirense (top division), Académico de Viseu F.C. and Académica de Coimbra (both in the LigaPro).

Coaching career
After retiring at the age of 39, Peçanha returned to Paços de Ferreira as a goalkeeper coach. In September 2019, he was appointed manager of Portuguese third-level team C.D. Trofense. Only one month later, after four games and no wins, he was dismissed.

References

External links

Flapédia profile 

1980 births
Living people
People from São Gonçalo, Rio de Janeiro
Brazilian footballers
Association football goalkeepers
Campeonato Brasileiro Série B players
Campeonato Brasileiro Série C players
CR Flamengo footballers
Bangu Atlético Clube players
America Football Club (RJ) players
River Atlético Clube players
São Raimundo Esporte Clube footballers
Primeira Liga players
Liga Portugal 2 players
F.C. Paços de Ferreira players
C.S. Marítimo players
C.D. Feirense players
Académico de Viseu F.C. players
Associação Académica de Coimbra – O.A.F. players
Super League Greece players
Thrasyvoulos F.C. players
Liga I players
FC Rapid București players
FC Petrolul Ploiești players
FC Viitorul Constanța players
Brazilian expatriate footballers
Expatriate footballers in Portugal
Expatriate footballers in Greece
Expatriate footballers in Romania
Brazilian expatriate sportspeople in Portugal
Brazilian expatriate sportspeople in Greece
Brazilian expatriate sportspeople in Romania
Brazilian football managers
C.D. Trofense managers
Brazilian expatriate football managers
Expatriate football managers in Portugal
Sportspeople from Rio de Janeiro (state)